Tieton is a city in Yakima County, Washington, United States. The population was 1,389 at the 2020 census.

In recent years, Tieton has suffered economic depression, with the decline of its fruit warehouses. As of 2007, a Seattle lawyer and the founding president of the art publishing house Marquand Books have been investing in the city and attempting to revive it, with a project they call project "Mighty Tieton."

History

Tieton was officially incorporated on June 5, 1942.
Tieton gets its name from the Tieton River, meaning "roaring water".

Geography
Tieton is located at  (46.703160, -120.755824).

Tieton is located near the confluence of the Tieton River with the Naches River.

Climate
This climatic region is typified by large seasonal temperature differences, with warm to hot (and often humid) summers and cold (sometimes severely cold) winters.  According to the Köppen Climate Classification system, Tieton has a humid continental climate, abbreviated "Dfb" on climate maps.

Demographics

2010 census
As of the census of 2010, there were 1,191 people, 358 households, and 279 families living in the town. The racial makeup of the town was 59.9% White, 0.3% African American, 2.4% Native American, 0.3% Asian, 0.1% Pacific Islander, 31.9% from other races, and 5.3% from two or more races. Hispanic or Latino of any race were 64.4% of the population.

There were 358 households, of which 54.2% had children under the age of 18 living with them, 51.7% were married couples living together, 19.3% had a female householder with no husband present, 7.0% had a male householder with no wife present, and 22.1% were non-families. 16.2% of all households were made up of individuals, and 7.3% had someone living alone who was 65 years of age or older. The average household size was 3.33 and the average family size was 3.67.

The median age in the town was 29.2 years. 33.8% of residents were under the age of 18; 10.6% were between the ages of 18 and 24; 28.7% were from 25 to 44; 19.8% were from 45 to 64; and 7% were 65 years of age or older. The gender makeup of the town was 49.5% male and 50.5% female.

2000 census
As of the census of 2000, there were 1,154 people, 341 households, and 267 families living in the town. The population density was 1,516.8 people per square mile (586.3/km2). There were 363 housing units at an average density of 477.1 per square mile (184.4/km2). The racial makeup of the town was 54.07% White, 0.17% African American, 1.39% Native American, 0.69% Asian, 0.09% Pacific Islander, 41.33% from other races, and 2.25% from two or more races. Hispanic or Latino of any race were 54.33% of the population.

There were 341 households, out of which 52.2% had children under the age of 18 living with them, 61.0% were married couples living together, 13.8% had a female householder with no husband present, and 21.7% were non-families. 18.5% of all households were made up of individuals, and 9.1% had someone living alone who was 65 years of age or older. The average household size was 3.38 and the average family size was 3.88.

In the town the age distribution of the population shows 37.2% under the age of 18, 11.4% from 18 to 24, 30.5% from 25 to 44, 14.2% from 45 to 64, and 6.7% who were 65 years of age or older. The median age was 26 years. For every 100 females, there were 99.3 males. For every 100 females age 18 and over, there were 94.4 males.

The median income for a household in the town was $30,052, and the median income for a family was $34,583. Males had a median income of $24,750 versus $18,750 for females. The per capita income for the town was $12,439. About 14.5% of families and 17.9% of the population were below the poverty line, including 21.9% of those under age 18 and 26.3% of those age 65 or over.

References

External links
 City of Tieton
 Mighty Tieton website

Cities in Yakima County, Washington
Cities in Washington (state)
Washington placenames of Native American origin